Tindr is a crater on Jupiter's moon Callisto. It is named after one of the ancestors of Ottar in Norse mythology. This is an example of a central pit impact crater.

References

Surface features on Callisto (moon)
Impact craters on Jupiter's moons